Easterly Winds is an album by American jazz pianist Jack Wilson featuring performances recorded and released on the Blue Note label in 1967.

Reception
The Allmusic review by Stephen Thomas Erlewine awarded the album 4 stars and stated "Easterly Winds provides an excellent contrast to Jack Wilson's first Blue Note album, Something Personal. Where his label debut was cool and romantic, Easterly Winds is a brassy, funky collection of soul-jazz and hard bop with instant appeal... It's another impressive, enjoyable effort from one of the most underrated pianists on Blue Note's '60s roster".

Track listing
All compositions by Jack Wilson except as noted
 "Do It" - 6:25
 "On Children" - 5:25
 "A Time for Love" (Johnny Mandel) - 5:46
 "Easterly Winds" - 5:55
 "Nirvanna" - 6:34
 "Frank's Tune" (Frank Strozier) - 8:00

Personnel
Jack Wilson - piano
Lee Morgan - trumpet (tracks 1, 2 & 4-6)
Garnett Brown - trombone (tracks 1, 2 & 4-6)
Jackie McLean - alto saxophone (tracks 1, 2 & 4-6)
Bob Cranshaw - bass
Billy Higgins - drums

References

Blue Note Records albums
Jack Wilson (jazz pianist) albums
1968 albums
Albums recorded at Van Gelder Studio
Albums produced by Duke Pearson